Stylumia is an Indian software as a service company based in Bangalore, Karnataka. Stylumia is better known for providing artificial intelligence-driven fashion analytics tools to apparel industries.

Formation and services
In 2015, the Stylumia was founded by an entrepreneur Ganesh Subramanian. Since its inception, the company has developed several market Intelligence tools for fashion industry. In 2016, Stylumia has introduced artificial intelligence based tools for fashion trend forecasting, demand prediction, predictive distribution and design generation. In 2017, Stylumia expanded their business to Europe. In 2020, Stylumia expanded their business to North America.

Stylumia has helped "reduce fashion industry's carbon footprints by 60 million garments per annum."
The company has been recognised for its sustainability efforts and was chosen as one of the six circular change makers in 2019.

In 2019, Stylumia was selected for the Target Accelerator Program to support Target’s global business strategy.

Recognition
Nasscom Emerge50 Product, 2019
Amazon AI Conclave Award – Retail, 2019
Circular Changemaker by Fashion for Good, 2019
 Aegis Graham Bell Award

References

External links 

2015 establishments in Karnataka
Companies based in Bangalore
Software companies established in 2015
Software companies of India
Indian companies established in 2015